Thomas Kwesi Nasah (born March 5, 1972) is a Ghanaian politician and member of the Sixth Parliament of the Fourth Republic of Ghana representing the Gushiegu Constituency in the Northern Region on the ticket of the National Democratic Congress.

Early life and education 
Nasah was born on March 5, 1972. He hails from  Zamamshiegu, a town in the Northern Region of Ghana. He graduated from Salaga Secondary School, Ghana and obtained his GCE Ordinary Level in 1992.

Career 
Thomas was an entrepreneur, farmer and agriculturist. He was also part of Business Committee, Committee on Poverty Reduction Strategy, Works and Housing.

Politics 
Nasah is a member of the National Democratic Congress (NDC). In 2012, he contested for the Gushiegu seat on the ticket of the NDC sixth parliament of the fourth republic and won. He began his political career in 2009 after being declared winner of the 2008 Ghanaian General Elections for his constituency and elected into the 5th Parliament of the 4th Republic.

Personal life 
Nasah is a Christian and attends Church of Pentecost. He is married with five children.

References 

Living people
1972 births
National Democratic Congress (Ghana) politicians
People from Northern Region (Ghana)
Ghanaian MPs 2009–2013
Ghanaian MPs 2013–2017
Ghanaian Pentecostals